Tillandsia afonsoana is a species in the genus Tillandsia. This species is native to Brazil.

References

afonsoana
Flora of Brazil